John Leather may refer to:
 John Walter Leather, agricultural chemist
 John Towlerton Leather, British civil engineering contractor